Jaswantiben Jamnadas Popat is an Indian businesswoman, who is one of the founders of Shri Mahila Griha Udyog Lijjat Papad, a women's worker cooperative involved in manufacturing of various fast-moving consumer goods. On January 26, 2021, the Government of India conferred her India's fourth-highest civilian award the Padma Shri in Trade and Industry category.

As of 2021, she was reported to be 91 years old. She is one of the seven founders who founded the company producing popular 'Lijjat Papad' in 1959 as a household venture. Her organization has employed nearly 45,000 women.

See also 
 List of Padma Shri award recipients (2020–2029)

References

20th-century Indian businesswomen
20th-century Indian businesspeople
Recipients of the Padma Bhushan in trade and industry
Businesspeople from Maharashtra
People from Gujarat
1930 births
Living people